The Mirusha waterfalls are a series of waterfalls found in the Mirusha Park, in central Kosovo. The waterfalls have, over time, created canyons and caves, which are famous throughout the country. The river has carved a  canyon and created 13 lakes with waterfalls between them. The waterfalls are one of the most visited attractions of the area and people often swim there. The walls around the waterfalls are white in colour, whereas the water from the Mirusha river is a dirty brown. The cliffs around some pools are used for high-diving competitions. The waterfall's caves are also popular with visitors.

Gallery

References

External links
 Aerial video: Mirusha Waterfalls in Spring

Waterfalls of Kosovo
Natural monuments of Kosovo